Laverock is the Scots word for a lark.  It may refer to:

Laverock, Pennsylvania, a small unincorporated community in the United States
, a destroyer of the British Royal Navy
Charles Laverock Lambe, British air marshal
Hugh Laverock (martyr)
Laverock Ha, and early name for Larkhall, South Lanarkshire, Scotland

See also
Caerlaverock, a place in Scotland
Lavernock, a hamlet in the Vale of Glamorgan, Wales
Laverick, a surname
Laverack, or English settler
Laverack (surname)